Kendal Nezan is a French-Kurdish nuclear physicist and president of the Kurdish Institute of Paris. He was born in Turkey. He is also a board member of the Washington Kurdish Institute.

In 1975, Nezan established the France-Kurdistan Society, which included the leading French intellectual Jean-Paul Sartre.

Nezan maintains close relations with numerous European governments and the European Parliament.

See also
 Kurdish Institute of Paris
 Kurmancî Linguistic magazine.
 Kurmanji

External links 
 The Kurdish Institute of Paris Kurdish language, history, books and latest news articles.
 Archive Reportages, entretiens et articles faites avec Dr. Kendal NEZAN.
 Kendal Nezan Biography

Notes

Living people
French nuclear physicists
Turkish scientists
Kurdish physicists
Year of birth missing (living people)